Cyclone of the Saddle is a 1935 American Western film directed by Elmer Clifton, starring Rex Lease, Janet Chandler, Bobby Nelson, and Yakima Canutt.

Cast
 Rex Lease as Andy Thomas
 Janet Chandler as Sue
 Bobby Nelson as Dick
 Yakima Canutt as Snake
 Helen Gibson as Ma
 Milburn Morante as Pa
 Charles Davis as High Hawk
 Chief Standing Bear as Porcupine
 Chief Thunder Cloud as Yellow Wolf
 George Chesebro as Cherokee Carter
 Art Mix as Pioneer
 William Desmond as Wagon master

Plot
Settlers crossing the plains are being terrorized by a group of marauders, some posing as Indians.  Andy Thomas, a cavalry soldier, is tasked by his fort's commander to go undercover and in order to stop the outlaws.  He meets a wagon train, which includes the Cutters, Ma, Pa, Sue and Dick, who are making their way to their homestead.  They are attacked by the marauders, but fend them off, although Pa Cutter is killed during the battle.  Two of the outlaws join the wagon train and one of them, Cherokee, harasses Sue, but Andy puts a stop to that.  When Cherokee dares him to break a wild pony, Andy does, and afterwards is nicknamed the "Cyclone of the Saddle".  

The remaining Cutters make it to their homestead, but Cherokee continues his harassment of Sue. When she is defended by her brother, who wounds Cherokee in the hand, the outlaw kills two braves from the local tribe and frames Dick for their murders.  The Indians abduct Dick and his horse, Black Fox, but Black Fox manages to escape and make his way to Andy.  Cherokee riles the Indians into attacking the settlers, but Andy and the cavalry arrive in time to put down the uprising, and inform the Indian chief that it was really Cherokee who killed his two men.  Cherokee is given to the Indians for justice, and Andy and Sue make plans for the future.

Reception
The Ouachita Citizen gave the film a positive review, calling it "A thrilling story of the old west...", and "...a great picture and one of the most exciting we've ever seen".  They felt that the film was full of excitement and action, and paid praise to the stunt work of Yakima Canutt and his "bull-whipping" skills.  The Shreveport Journal also gave the film a positive review, calling Rex Lease a "dynamo of action."

References

1935 films
1935 Western (genre) films
American black-and-white films
American Western (genre) films
Films directed by Elmer Clifton
1930s English-language films
1930s American films